Melvin John "Mad Dog" O'Billovich (June 5, 1942 – February 13, 1995) was a Canadian football player who played for the Hamilton Tiger-Cats. He won the Grey Cup with Hamilton in 1967. He previously played college football at Oregon State University under coach Tommy Prothro. His brother, Bob O'Billovich, and son Tony O'Billovich also played in the CFL.

O'Billovich died of heart disease in 1995. His ashes were scattered at the Tommy Prothro Football Complex practice football fields at Oregon State University. He was inducted into the Oregon Sports Hall of Fame in 2008.

References

1942 births
1995 deaths
Hamilton Tiger-Cats players
Oregon State Beavers football players
Sportspeople from Butte, Montana
American football linebackers
Canadian football linebackers
American players of Canadian football
Players of American football from Montana